WMEQ may refer to:

 WMEQ (AM), a radio station (880 AM) licensed to Menomonie, Wisconsin, United States
 WMEQ-FM, a radio station (92.1 FM) licensed to Menomonie, Wisconsin, United States